John Therry Catholic College is a systemic Roman Catholic co-educational secondary day school, located in , Campbelltown, New South Wales, Australia, established in the tradition of the Marist Brothers. Karen Young  was appointed principal in 2008.In 2018 Wayne Marshall was appointed Principal and the college has gone from strength to strength. 2021 saw the Colleges best ever HSC results and the school was ranked 195th in the state - a rise of 260 places over two years.

History 
John Therry Catholic High School opened on 9 February 1981, enrolling 300 students for Years 7 to 9. The principal at opening was Brother Clarence Cunningham, until 1986, when he moved to Mount Carmel High School.

International triathlete Natalie Van Coevorden attended the school around the early 2000s.

See also

 List of Catholic schools in New South Wales
 Catholic education in Australia

References

External links
 John Therry Catholic High School Website

Educational institutions established in 1981
1981 establishments in Australia
Roman Catholic Diocese of Wollongong
Catholic secondary schools in New South Wales
Association of Marist Schools of Australia